Stellah Sinnott (born 1962) is a camogie manager, winner of a Manager of the Year award after she guided Wexford to their first All Ireland title in 32 years in 2007. She was the first woman to manage a first rank inter-county camogie team.

References

Living people
Camogie managers
Wexford camogie players
1962 births